The Master (released internationally as The Final Master) is a 2015 Chinese martial arts film written, co-produced, and directed by Xu Haofeng, about the last Wing Chun master’s quest to pass down his art in pre-WWII China. The film stars Liao Fan, Jiang Wenli, Chin Shih-chieh, Song Jia and Song Yang.

Plot

Grandmaster Chen, the last surviving practitioner of the Wing Chun style of martial arts, arrives in Tianjin with the desire to open a martial-arts school. Upon defeating all of Grandmaster Zheng's disciples, Chen receives an offer from Zheng to establish a school jointly, which Chen declines. Zheng then threatens to expel Chen from the city. He gives Chen another offer: if Chen can train a disciple to defeat the eight schools of Tianjin, then Chen will be allowed to open his school. Zheng reveals that he plans to defeat the disciple after the eight schools are defeated, thus enhancing his own reputation. Meanwhile, Chen decides that he should marry a local woman, and proposes to a waitress named Zhao. One day, Chen and Zhao are beset by thugs, whom Chen easily defeats. This catches the attention of Geng, a local rickshaw-puller, who visits Chen's residence. Chen approves of Geng's courageous personality and decides to take Geng as his disciple.

Geng turns out to be a prodigy in Wing Chun and helps Chen to attain some of the needed victories well ahead of schedule. However, this draws the ire of an organized crime leader named Madame Zou, who attacks Chen, forcing the latter to distance himself from Geng. Later, Zhao realizes that Chen intends to betray Geng, leading Chen to expel her from the house. Zheng is visited by a former student, Lin, who is now an officer in the military. Lin requests that Zheng fight with him on camera, so he can send the film to the Viceroy. Zheng thoroughly defeats Lin in sparring, but Lin proceeds to ambush Zheng and seriously injure him, revealing himself to have been secretly in Madame Zou's employ. Zheng decides to leave Tianjin and settle in Brazil. Chen, realizing that he and Geng are in danger owing to Madame Zou, offers to take Geng and leave Tianjin, but Madame Zou prohibits them, because she does not want to be perceived by the public as a bully. Instead, she allows Chen to open a school for a year, after which he must leave Tianjin, and sends thugs to assassinate Geng. When that fails, she sends Lin to attack Geng. Geng is stabbed and dumped in the countryside of Tianjin, but instead of seeking medical aid, he chooses to walk back into Tianjin, whereupon he dies of blood loss.

On the day when Chen is to open his school, he visits a tea-girl who tells him about what happened to Geng, and shows him one of Geng's books which has Geng's bloodstains inside the pages. Chen is visibly moved, and during the opening ceremony, attacks Lin, who fights back with the assistance of Madame Zou's thugs. Chen manages to kill Lin before the thugs subdue him. He then offers to share his secrets and to train students for Madame Zou in return for not being executed. While getting ready for a demonstration, Chen flees from captivity, and the entire martial arts community of Tianjin, all nineteen schools, chase after him. Upon being trapped in a narrow alleyway, Chen defeats each of the nineteen masters in a duel, but decides to spare Madame Zou's life. Chen then boards a train for Guangdong, thinking that Zhao is already on her way there. However, Zhao had not yet left Tianjin, and is captured by Madame Zou. The latter spares Zhao and sends spies to follow her, with the aim of delivering a message to Chen warning him to keep silent about what happened.

Cast

 Liao Fan as Master Chen Shi (The Master)
Jiang Wenli as Master Zou – The Madame
Chin Shih-chieh as Zheng Shan’ao – The Grandmaster
Song Jia as Zhao Guohui – Mrs. Chen
Song Yang as Geng Liangchen – The Apprentice
Huang Jue as Lin Xiwen – The Colonel
Madina Memet as Tea Girl
Ma Jun as Head Coolie
Chen Kuan-tai as Kwoon Head
Vicky
Zhang Aoyue
Hung Yan-yan
Leon Dai
Li Bo

Release
The film was released in China and Taiwan in December 2015. It grossed  at the Chinese box office.

North American release
The film premiered at the 2016 Seattle International Film Festival on May 28, 2016. Director Xu Haofeng was present at the festival. Following its North America premiere, Director Xu travelled to San Francisco and Los Angeles to host preview screenings on May 30 and June 1, 2016, respectively. Well Go USA released the film in the United States on a Blu-ray and DVD combo package as well as Video on Demand on July 25, 2017. The combo package's special features include two featurettes and one trailer for the film.

Reception

Critical reception
On review aggregator Rotten Tomatoes, the film holds an approval rating of 71% based on 17 reviews, with a weighted average rating of 7.3/10. On Metacritic, the film has a weighted average score of 72 out of 100, based on 13 critics, indicating "generally favorable reviews".

Awards and nominations
The film was nominated for Best Screenplay, Best Choreography and Best Supporting Actress at the 33rd Golden Horse Awards. It won Best Choreography.

The film was nominated for Best Actor and Best Supporting Actress at the 31st Golden Rooster Awards.

References

External links
Well Go USA official site

Wuxia films
Chinese martial arts films
Heyi Pictures films
Huaxia Film Distribution films
Films based on Chinese novels
Films directed by Xu Haofeng
2015 martial arts films